The Papua New Guinea women's national cricket team, nicknamed the Lewas, represents the country of Papua New Guinea in international women's cricket. The team is organised by Cricket PNG, an associate member of the International Cricket Council (ICC).

Papua New Guinea has been the leading women's associate team in the ICC East Asia-Pacific (EAP) since its international debut in 2006. It has represented EAP at the 50-Over World Cup Qualifier and T20 World Cup Qualifier on a number of occasions, making the semi-finals of the 2018 and 2019 T20 World Cup Qualifiers. It was awarded One Day International (ODI) status in 2022.

History
Papua New Guinea made its international debut in September 2006, playing a three-match series against Japan to determine which team would represent the ICC East Asia-Pacific (EAP) region at the 2008 World Cup Qualifier. Papua New Guinea won the series against Japan three–nil, but at the World Cup Qualifier won only two matches, both against Bermuda.

The team failed to qualify for either the 2011 World Cup Qualifier or the 2013 World Twenty20 Qualifier, with Japan representing the EAP region on both occasions.

At the 2015 Pacific Games, which Papua New Guinea hosted, a women's cricket event was included for the first time. The team narrowly lost to Samoa in the final, having been undefeated up to that point. Later in the year, Papua New Guinea participated at its second global tournament, the 2015 World Twenty20 Qualifier, placing fifth out of eight teams.

In April 2018, the ICC granted full Women's Twenty20 International (WT20I) status to all its members. Therefore, all Twenty20 matches played between Papua New Guinea women and another international side since 1 July 2018 have been a full WT20I.

The team played its first WT20I match against Bangladesh on 7 July 2018 at VRA Cricket Ground, Amstelveen in Netherlands in the 2018 ICC Women's World Twenty20 Qualifier.

In December 2020, the ICC announced the qualification pathway for the 2023 ICC Women's T20 World Cup. Papua New Guinea were named in the 2021 ICC Women's T20 World Cup EAP Qualifier regional group, alongside seven other teams. However, in August 2021, the International Cricket Council (ICC) confirmed that the tournament had been cancelled due to the COVID-19 pandemic, and due to their ranking, Papua New Guinea qualified for the global qualifier held in 2022. In late 2021, Australian Kath Hempenstall was appointed head coach of the Lewas.

In May 2022, the ICC announced Papua New Guinea as one of five women's sides to gain Women's One Day International (ODI) status. Netherlands, Scotland, Thailand and the United States are the other four teams.

Current squad

This lists all the players who were named in the most recent squad. Updated on 9 October 2022.

Uncapped players are listed in italics.

Tournament history

ICC Women's T20 World Cup Qualifier
 2015: 5th (DNQ)
 2018: 4th (DNQ)
 2019: 4th (DNQ)
 2022: 5th (DNQ)

Pacific Games
 2019: 2nd

Records and Statistics 
International Match Summary — Papua New Guinea Women
 
Last updated 18 March 2023

Twenty20 International 

Highest team total: 219/5 v. Fiji on 3 October 2022 at Independence Park Ground 2, Port Vila.
Highest individual innings: 88*, Naoani Vare v. Fiji on 5 October 2022 at Vanuatu Cricket Ground, Port Vila.
Best innings bowling: 5/2, Hollan Doriga v. Fiji on 3 October 2022 at Vanuatu Cricket Ground (Oval 2), Port Vila.

Most T20I runs for PNG Women

Most T20I wickets for PNG Women

T20I record versus other nations

Records complete to WT20I #1388. Last updated 18 March 2023.

See also
 List of Papua New Guinea women Twenty20 International cricketers

References

Further reading

 
 

Cricket in Papua New Guinea
Cricket, women's
Women's national cricket teams
Women
2006 establishments in Papua New Guinea
Women's sport in Papua New Guinea